Flow (styled as FLOW) is a Japanese rock band formed in 1998 as a five-piece band made up of two vocalists, a guitarist, a bassist, and a drummer. They are signed to Sacra Music. As of February 2023, the band has released 39 singles and 12 studio albums. Their songs have been featured in the opening sequences of several anime and Japanese drama series.

History
The group began in 1993 when brothers Kōshi (elder: vocals, rhythm guitar) and Take (younger: lead guitar) began playing together. They formed Flow in 1998, and by 2000, were joined by Keigo (vocals), Gotō (bass) and Iwasaki (drums). In 2001, the band released its first maxi single, Flow #0. In 2002, the group released two mini-albums within the same year, followed by "Okuru Kotoba", Flow's first cover single, released in January 2003, which remained on the Oricon indie chart for seven consecutive weeks and also hit No. 6 on the overall singles chart. In the spring of that year, their first full-scale album Splash!!! debuted at No. 2 on the Oricon album chart. In July 2003, Flow released the single "Blaster" on the major label Ki/oon Records. In April 2004, they released "GO!!!", which stayed on the Oricon Top 10 Chart for three weeks. In May 2004, Flow released their first major label album Game.

A string of singles followed and in July 2005 the band released its third album, Golden Coast. Since the release of Golden Coast, Flow has released two singles with new A-sides, but one of these Around The World / Kandata was a double A-side release. The songs "GO!!!" and "Re:member" both served as opening themes to the anime series Naruto, as well as "Sign" for Naruto Shippuden. "Days" was the first opening for Bones' Eureka Seven anime, and "Realize" was the opening for the PlayStation 2 video games based on the same series. Flow performed live in America for the first time in Dallas, Texas on September 2, 2006 at AnimeFest which was held at the Hyatt Hotel and Convention Center in downtown Dallas. Flow then released "Colors" in 2006, the first opening for Sunrise's original series, Code Geass: Lelouch of the Rebellion.

Their song "Answer" was the first opening theme for the live action Japanese drama Detective School Q. They performed "Night Parade" with the hip-hop band Home Made Kazoku. In February 2008, they released a new single titled "Arigatō", followed by Persona -trinity soul-s new opening, "Word of the Voice" in June 2008. They performed Code Geass: Lelouch of the Rebellion R2'''s second opening theme "World End" released in 2008. In 2009, the band performed "Sign", the sixth opening for Naruto Shippuden. The band released a B-side compilation album on November 4, 2009. Their single "Calling" was featured as the ending for the anime Heroman. Flow returned to North America to perform at Anime Central, in Rosemont, Illinois on May 20, 2011, and FanimeCon in San Jose, California on May 28, 2010 and in May 2011. Their song "Hey!!!" was the third opening theme for the anime Beelzebub, and the song "Brave Blue" was used as the second opening theme for the anime Eureka Seven AO. In 2012, they performed in France for the first time at Japan Expo.

They provided a cover of "Cha-La Head-Cha-La" as the main theme song for the film Dragon Ball Z: Battle of Gods; the song, coupled with an insert song from the film, was released as a double A-side single on March 20, 2013, and subsequently would be featured as the opening theme for Dragon Ball video games such as Dragon Ball Z: Battle of Z and Dragon Ball XenoVerse. Flow released their eighth studio album Flow The Max!!! on March 27, 2013. Flow went to Brazil for the first time to perform at Ressacca Friends in 2013. Their single "Ai Ai Ai ni Utarete Bye Bye Bye" released on February 26, 2014 was used as the second opening to the anime Samurai Flamenco. Flow returned to Brazil in the summer of 2014 to perform at Anime Friends in Sao Paulo and at SuperCon in Recife. They returned to perform at AnimeFest after 8 years in August 2014 at the Sheraton Dallas Hotel. Their single, "7 -seven-", was a collaboration with the band Granrodeo and was featured as the ending theme to the anime The Seven Deadly Sins. Flow released their second anime best album compilation Flow Anime Best Kiwami on February 25, 2015. Flow's first-ever world tour, Flow World Tour 2015 Kiwami, saw them performing five times in Japan and fourteen times in seven other countries. Their first digital single, was released on March 21, 2015 and was used as the image song for the Naruto stage play Live Spectacle Naruto. Their single  was used as the 34th ending theme of Naruto Shippuden.

Their single "Steppin' out" was used as the opening theme of Durarara!!x2: Ketsu. Flow's single  / Burn" was released on August 24, 2016; the songs are used as the opening themes of Tales of Zestiria the X and Tales of Berseria. Their single "Innosense" was released on February 8, 2017; the song was used as the second ending theme of Tales of Zestiria the X. The band covered "Classic" on the album Tribute of Mucc -en- as a tribute to the band Mucc released on November 22, 2017. Flow returned to North America to perform at Anime Boston on March 30, 2018. They covered "D.O.D. (Drink Or Die)" for the June 6, 2018 hide tribute album Tribute Impulse. They also performed the theme song  for the drama series Sachiiro no One Room. Their song "Break it down" was used in the 2020 game Naruto x Boruto Ninja Tribes. Flow again performed at the Nippon Budokan on January 30, 2019. They released their album Tribalythm on April 10, 2019 and their tour Flow Live Tour 2019: Tribalythm promoted the album.

Flow successfully performed Flow Chokaigi 2020 "Anime Shibari Returns" at the Makuhari Messe Event Hall on February 24, 2020. They covered Granrodeo's "Modern Strange Cowboy" on the album Granrodeo Tribute Album "Rodeo Freak" released on May 13, 2020. Flow's song  was used for opening theme of the 2020 anime series Shadowverse. They held a special online concert series featuring all 11 of their albums titled Flow Special Online Live Comprehensive Album Series: Flame of 12 Months every 26 of the month, which started on September 26, 2020 and ended on August 26, 2021. The band produced  for the virtual YouTuber agency Nijisanji, which celebrated their 3rd anniversary in 2021. The song was sung by a total of 12 livers, including Akina Saegusa, Furen E Lustario, Hayato Kagami, Kaede Higuchi, Kuzuha, Rena Yorumi, Rion Takamiya, Ryushen, Saku Sasaki, Sara Hoshikawa, Shellin Burgundy, and Toya Kenmochi. Their single "United Sparrows" was used for the ending theme of the 2021 anime series Back Arrow. On August 9, 2021, they held their first in-person concert since Covid-19 pandemic titled Flow The Carnival 2021 ~Shinsekai~ in Line Cube Shibuya.

The single "Dice" was released on December 15, 2021 and contained three collaboration songs. "Dice" was used for the first opening theme song of the 15th anniversary rebroadcast of the 2006 anime series Code Geass: Lelouch of the Rebellion.  was featured in the slot machine game Pachislot Anemone: Eureka Seven HI-Evolution.  was a partnership between Flow and Afterglow from the BanG Dream! Girls Band Party! mobile rhythm game. The two parties also collaborated for a cover of "Colors", which is a playable song in Girls Band Party!; "Yūshō" was also added to the game for a limited time from December 11, 2021 to January 10, 2022.

Two songs from the single "Gold" were used in "Naruto" franchise.  was used as the image song for the stage play Live Spectacle "Naruto" ~Uzumaki Naruto Monogatari~, while "Gold" used as the tenth opening theme song for the anime Boruto: Naruto Next Generation in January 2022. The new single titled " was a collaboration with the band Orange Range and was used for the second opening theme of 15th Anniversary re-run of Code Geass: Lelouch of the Rebellion R2'' anime. The single also includes a cover of Orange Range's "O2".

Members

Kohshi
Position: Vocalist, Rhythm Guitarist
Real name: Kōshi Asakawa
Birthday: April 22, 1977
Birthplace: Saitama

Keigo
Position: Vocalist
Real name: Keigo Hayashi
Birthday: July 1, 1977
Birthplace: Tokyo

Take
Position: Lead Guitarist, Backing Vocalist
Real name: Takeshi Asakawa
Birthday: August 31, 1978
Birthplace: Saitama

Got's
Position: Bassist, Backing Vocalist
Real name: Kohtaro Gotō
Birthday: January 26, 1977
Birthplace: Niigata

Iwasaki
Position: Drummer
Real Name: Hiroshi Iwasaki
Birthday: November 21, 1969
Birth Place: Osaka

Discography

Albums

Studio albums

Extended plays

Compilation albums

Singles

Indie singles

Digital singles

Videos

DVDs & Blu-rays

Fanclub-limited DVDs & Blu-rays

Others

Compilations

Guest appearances

Credited work

Covers

References

External links

  

Japanese alternative rock groups
Japanese indie rock groups
Japanese punk rock groups
Japanese rock music groups
Musical quintets
Sacra Music artists
Anime musical groups
Musical groups from Saitama Prefecture
Musical groups established in 1998
Asian Wave contestants
Amuse Inc. artists